Nathaniel Niles may refer to:

 Nathaniel Niles (figure skater) (1886–1932), American figure skater and tennis player
 Nathaniel Niles (politician) (1741–1828), United States Representative from Vermont
 Nathaniel Niles Jr. (1791–1869), U.S. diplomat